Paal Olav Berg (18 January 1873 – 24 May 1968), born in Hammerfest, was a Norwegian politician for the Liberal Party. He was Minister of Social Affairs 1919–1920, and Minister of Justice 1924–1926. He was the 12th Chief Justice of the Supreme Court from 1929 to 1946.

Paal Berg was instrumental in the German Dismissal of pro-Nazi puppet regime of Vidkun Quisling to be replaced by a council of Norwegian citizens, including himself on April 15, 1940. This was
overseen after April 24 by Hitler's appointee Josef Terboven. Despite holding this position in the occupied government, Berg was far from a collaborator. Indeed, William L. Shirer names him the secret leader of the Norwegian Resistance. He was elected a Foreign Honorary Member of the American Academy of Arts and Sciences in 1947. He was a member of the Norwegian Association for Women's Rights.

Notes

Literature
 William L. Shirer: "The Rise and Fall of the Third Reich", Simon & Schuster, New York 1990 
 

1873 births
1968 deaths
Government ministers of Norway
Norwegian jurists
Chief justices of Norway
People from Hammerfest
Fellows of the American Academy of Arts and Sciences
Norwegian Association for Women's Rights people
Ministers of Justice of Norway